McCarroll is a surname. Notable people with the surname include:

Bonnie McCarroll (1897–1929), American rodeo performer
Jay McCarroll (born 1974), American fashion designer
June McCarroll (1867–1954), American nurse
Tony McCarroll (born 1971), English drummer

See also

Carroll (surname)
McCarrell
O'Carroll (surname)
McCarroll Peak, a mountain in Antarctica
Mac Cearbhaill, a Gaelic Irish clan